Edna High School is a public high school located in the city of Edna, Texas, United States and classified as a 3A school by the UIL.  It is a part of the Edna Independent School District located in northwest Jackson County.   In 2015, the school was rated "Met Standard" by the Texas Education Agency.

Athletics
The Edna Cowboys compete in these sports - 

Cross Country, Volleyball, Football, Basketball, Powerlifting, Golf, Tennis, Track, Baseball & Softball

State Titles
Girls Basketball - 
1965(2A)
Boys Track - 
2012(2A),

State Finalists
Football - 
1965(2A)
Girls Basketball - 
1990(3A)

Notable alumni
Stone Cold Steve Austin - American actor and retired professional wrestler.

References

External links
Edna ISD website

Public high schools in Texas
Schools in Jackson County, Texas